Iatrosophist is an ancient title designating a professor of medicine. It comes from  'doctor' and  'learned person'. People who have been referred to by the title include:

 Adamantius
 Cassius Iatrosophista
 Gessius of Petra
 Magnus of Nisibis
 Oribasius
 Palladius (physician)
 Paul of Aegina
 
 Zeno of Cyprus

See also
Iatrosophia

References

Byzantine physicians